The 2016–17 Biathlon World Cup – World Cup 4 was held in Oberhof, Germany, from 5 January until 8 January 2017.

Schedule of events

Medal winners

Men

Women

Achievements

 Best performance for all time

 , 17th place in Sprint
 , 22nd place in Sprint
 , 26th place in Sprint
 , 29th place in Sprint
 , 33rd place in Sprint and 31st place in Pursuit
 , 37th place in Sprint
 , 39th place in Sprint
 , 41st place in Sprint and Pursuit
 , 51st place in Sprint
 , 52nd place in Sprint and 43rd place in Pursuit
 , 55th place in Sprint and Pursuit
 , 63rd place in Sprint
 , 77th place in Sprint
 , 79th place in Sprint
 , 13th place in Pursuit
 , 23rd place in Pursuit
 , 38th place in Pursuit
 , 9th place in Sprint
 , 10th place in Sprint
 , 19th place in Sprint
 , 27th place in Sprint

 First World Cup race

 , 82nd place in Sprint
 , 86th place in Sprint
 , 88th place in Sprint
 , 79th place in Sprint

References 

2016–17 Biathlon World Cup
Biathlon
January 2017 sports events in Europe
Biathlon competitions in Germany
Sport in Oberhof, Germany
2010s in Thuringia
Sport in Thuringia